Sally Rosanna Lavelle (born 8 August 1979) better known simply as Rosanna Lavelle, is an English actress.  She attended the National Student Theatre in 1997 and then studied at Cambridge University.

Lavelle has won critical praise for her stage roles.  She was called the "emotional core" of the 2006 revival of An Inspector Calls.  Lavelle's performance as Beatrice in A View from the Bridge with the National Student Drama Festival won a Sunday Times Outstanding Performance Award, Scarborough.

She was working as an English literature and drama teacher at The Henrietta Barnett School, in North London, but has now quit this job to have a baby.
 
She is currently working at a school in Sheffield as an English teacher.

Select Credits

References

External links

Agency CV

1979 births
Living people